Roger De Cnijf (born 14 April 1956) is a Belgian former professional racing cyclist. He rode in three editions of the Tour de France and one edition of the Vuelta a España. His most notable win was stage 4 of the 1979 Vuelta a España.

Major results
1979
 1st Stage 4 Vuelta a España
 9th Overall Ronde van Nederland
1980
 1st Stage 3 Deutschland Tour
 1st Stage 2 Vuelta a Mallorca
 8th Grote Prijs Jef Scherens
1981
 2nd Druivenkoers-Overijse
 8th GP Stad Zottegem
 10th Amstel Gold Race
1982
 4th Grote Prijs Jef Scherens
1983
 8th Brabantse Pijl

References

External links

1956 births
Living people
Belgian male cyclists
Sportspeople from Leuven
Cyclists from Flemish Brabant
Belgian Vuelta a España stage winners